Karen may refer to:

 Karen (name), a given name and surname
 Karen (slang), a term and meme for a demanding woman displaying certain behaviors

People 

 Karen people, an ethnic group in Myanmar and Thailand
 Karen languages or Karenic languages
 House of Karen, a historical feudal family of Tabaristan, Iran
 Karen (singer), Danish R&B singer

Places 

 Karen, Kenya, a suburb of Nairobi
 Karen City or Hualien City, Taiwan
 Karen Hills or Karen Hills, Myanmar
 Karen State, a state in Myanmar

Film and television 

 Karen (1964 TV series), an American sitcom
 Karen (1975 TV series), an American sitcom
 Karen (film), a 2021 American crime thriller

Other uses 

 Karen (orangutan), the first to have open heart surgery
 AS-10 Karen or Kh-25, a Soviet air-to-ground missile
 Kiwi Advanced Research and Education Network
 Tropical Storm Karen (disambiguation)

See also 

 Karren (name)
 Karyn (given name)
 Keren, Eritrea a city
 Caren (disambiguation)
 Garen (disambiguation)
 Karan (disambiguation)
 Karin (disambiguation)
 Keren (disambiguation)